Artidoro Berti (29 July 1920 – 9 January 2005) was an Italian long-distance runner. He competed in the marathon at the 1952 Summer Olympics.

References

External links
 

1920 births
2005 deaths
Athletes (track and field) at the 1952 Summer Olympics
Italian male long-distance runners
Italian male marathon runners
Olympic athletes of Italy
People from Pistoia
Sportspeople from the Province of Pistoia